In the 1947–48 season, USM Alger is competing in the First Division for the 11th season French colonial era, as well as the Forconi Cup. They will be competing in First Division, and the Forconi Cup.

Squad 1946-47  
GK: Berkani, Zitouni, Salvator
DF: Isgoti, Tobal, Benhaddad
MF: Hamdi, Chouane I, Chaouane II, Zemouri
FW: Smain, Bedaren, Zouaoui, El Kamal I, El Kamal II, Zâaf, Benzireg
+ Bouadjadj, Souci, Maglionni, Dauscal, Ramoul

Competitions

Overview

First Division

League table

Group B

Matches

Forconi Cup

References

External links
 L'Echo d'Alger : journal républicain du matin

USM Alger seasons
Algerian football clubs 1947–48 season